The Hitching Stone is a gritstone erratic block on Keighley Moor, North Yorkshire, near Earl Crag and the village of Cowling.  It is very close to the border between North Yorkshire and West Yorkshire and the border between Yorkshire and Lancashire.

It is also said to weigh a lot more than 1000 tonnes.

Geography 

History 
The Hitching Stone and all the other erratic boulders on Keighley Moor were put in place thousands to possibly millions of years ago during the Pleistocene Epoch.  The Hitching Stone most likely originally came from Earl Crag during this time.  As a result of the fact that The Hitching Stone lies at the borders of historic counties, ancient councils and parliaments met at the stone and markets, fairs, and other gatherings were also held at the stone, with the last fair being held in 1870.

Gallery

See also 

 Lund’s Tower
 Wainman’s Pinnacle

References

Further reading 

 T. Sharpe, The Pendle Zodiac, Thomas Sharpe, February 20, 2012. Exploring the Sacred Geometry, Ley alignments and recent Landscape Zodiac discoveries of Pendle - in the Rose County of Lancashire - from the perspective of Spiritual Science.

Stones
Sandstone formations